FC Kolkheti-1913 is a Georgian football club based in Poti. Following the 2022 season, the club earned promotion to Liga 2, the second division of Erovnuli Liga. 

Being registered in 1913, Kolkheti is considered one of the oldest clubs in the South Caucasus. Since the formation of independent Georgian leagues in 1990, they have spent 24 seasons in the top flight.

History

Domestic leagues

The Soviet period

The football club from Poti under the name Kolkhida (Colchis) for many years was a member of the Georgian Soviet championship until early 1960s. From 1962 to 1990, they spent 24 seasons in fourth and third divisions of the Soviet football system, including last consecutive eleven years in zone 9 of the Second league, with the 2nd place in 1989 being the best result.

Earning league trophies
When GFF formed the national league in early 1990, Kolkheti-1913 took part in an opening game against Iberia Tbilisi. The historic match held at Boris Paichadze stadium ended 1–0 in favour of the guest team. Therefore, Kolkheti became the first club to win a game in the history of Georgian national leagues.

Throughout the first decade, the Kolkhs were considered one of the strongest rivals. Apart from 1992/93, when they finished in 9th place, the club completed each season among top five teams with twice, in 1993-94 and 1996–97, coming second. In this period the team also earned the bronze medals three times. 

This success of the club was largely contributed to their sponsors from mid-1990s, the naval port of Poti.

Crisis begins
In 2006, after a foreign business company took over the port administration, the football club abruptly lost a significant income. Despite being 10th among 16 clubs in 2005/06, due to the severe financial crisis Kolkheti had to quit the league. 

The club climbed back to Umaglesi Liga following the 2009/10 season, but returned to the second league three years later. In 2011, a sponsorship deal with the naval port resumed to a less extent, which lasted for four years.

Battle for survival
Kolkheti were back in the top division in 2014-15, although further financial difficulties hit the club in 2018, which pushed them to the verge of bankruptcy. As Kolkheti amassed a large amount of debts, they were deducted six points. Eventually, the team was relegated.

While in Liga 2, Kolkheti still could not afford to pay off debts. In an emergency statement, the club appealed for urgent help. Meanwhile, they were slapped with another 6 points deduction. The overall situation badly affected the team. Three managers were sacked for unsatisfactory results within initial five months of the season. The tide remained unchanged, though. Only in the last matchday did Kolkheti manage to avoid automatic relegation, but after being thrashed by Samgurali Tskaltubo in play-offs they slumped to the third division.

In tier 3
In the initial two seasons Kolkheti were among primary promotion-chasers, although in both cases they suffered a setback in pursuit for an automatic promotion slot. The play-off results proved also unsuccessful despite the team's unbeaten aggregate score in the regular time. First they failed to beat WIT Georgia on penalties, and a year later lost in extra time to Rustavi on away goals. 

In 2022, too, Kolkheti ended up in the 2nd place. However, due to changes, made in the competition format before this season, the club ended their three year-long tenure in this division and won automatic promotion back to Liga 2.

European competitions
Based on successful performance in Umaglesi Liga, Kolkheti-1913 represented Georgia on UEFA Cup for four consecutive seasons from 1996 until 2000. 

The only victory achieved in this competition against Dinamo Minsk was insufficient for qualifying for the next round. Having lost the first leg 0–1, Kolkheti conceded an early goal at home and scored twice afterwards, but the away goals rule gave a final advantage to their opponents.

Seasons

Notes

Overall

Seasons spent in Georgian leagues since 1990:
 
• Umaglesi Liga / Erovnuli Liga (1st tier): 24

• Pirveli Liga / Erovnuli Liga 2 (2nd tier): 5

• Meore Liga /  Liga 3 (3rd tier): 3

Correct up to 2022 season

Current squad 
As of 28 February 2023

 (C)

 (On loan from Dinamo Batumi)

Managers
  Gela Sanaia (March - August 2017) 
  Oleksandr Shtelin (September - December 2017)
  Konstantin Galkin (February - March 2018)
  Nugzar Tvaradze (March - September 2018) 
  Viktor Demidov (September - December 2018)
  Paata Metreveli (February - April 2019)
  Soso Pilia (April - June 2019)
  Giorgi Krasovski (June - August 2019)
  Nugzar Tvaradze (August - October 2019)
  Vladimer Chkonia (October - December 2019)
  Davit Makharadze (February - October 2020)
  Nugzar Tvaradze (October - December 2020)
  Giorgi Krasovski (February - June 2021)
  Gia Gigatadze (June 2021 – May 2022)
  Davit Kvirkvelia (since June 2022)

The current manager has started his professional career both as a player and a coach at this club. Being initially appointed as assistant head coach in February 2022, he took charge of the team on 2 June.

Honours
• Georgian Soviet Championship 

Winners (2): 1978, 1988

• Soviet Second League Zone IX (Caucasus)

Runner-up (1): 1989

• Umaglesi Liga

Runners-up (2): 1993-94 and 1996-97

Third place (3): 1994-95, 1995-96, 1997-98

• Pirveli Liga

Runners-up (2): 2009-2010, 2013-2014 (A Group)

Third place (4): 1982, 1983, 1984, 1987.

• Liga 3

Runners-up (3): 2020,  2021,  2022

Stadium
Fazisi was built in 1961. Its reconstruction got under way in 2013, but it took seven years before the works were completed. Meanwhile, Kolkheti-1913 held their home games on Rugby Arena in Poti or in some neighbouring cities. Football returned to Fazisi in October 2019.

References

External links
 Profile on Soccerway

 
Kolkheti-1913 Poti
Poti
1913 establishments in Georgia (country)
Association football clubs established in 1913